Forget  is a village in the Canadian province of Saskatchewan within the Rural Municipality of Tecumseh No. 65 and Census Division No. 1. It is located just east of Stoughton, just off Highway 13.

The village is named in honour of Amédée E. Forget, the first Lieutenant Governor of Saskatchewan.

As Forget is a French name, the village is pronounced more like 'For-jay' than the English word forget.

History 
Forget incorporated as a village on November 21, 1904.

Demographics 

See also 
 Red Coat Trail
 List of communities in Saskatchewan
 List of villages in Saskatchewan

References

Further reading
Abley, Mark (1986) Beyond Forget: Rediscovering the Prairies, Canada: Douglas & McIntyre Ltd., reprinted 1988 by Chatto & Windus Ltd., London, UK, . Pages 10–14 focus on Forget and its hotel.

Villages in Saskatchewan
Tecumseh No. 65, Saskatchewan
Division No. 1, Saskatchewan